Didier Stainier (born 1963) is a Belgian/American developmental geneticist who is currently a director at the Max Planck Institute for Heart and Lung Research in Bad Nauheim, Germany.

Scientific career
Didier Stainier studied biology in Wales (United World College of the Atlantic), Belgium (University of Liège) and the USA (Brandeis University) where he got a BA in 1984. He has a PhD in biochemistry and biophysics from Harvard University (1990).  During his PhD work, he investigated axon guidance and target recognition in the developing mouse with Walter Gilbert.  Subsequently, he initiated the studies on zebrafish cardiac development as a Helen Hay Whitney postdoctoral fellow with Mark Fishman at the Massachusetts General Hospital (Boston).

Scientific interests
Together with the many students and postdocs in his laboratory, Stainier helped pioneer the use of the zebrafish model to study a wide range of questions pertaining to vertebrate organ development and function, and has published extensively. His forward genetic analyses of heart development revealed the unexpected role of several signaling pathways including sphingosine 1-phosphate signaling and the discovery of the long-elusive sphingosine 1-phosphate transporter. Additional genetic screens led to the elucidation of transcriptional networks regulating endoderm formation and endothelial cell specification as well as extracellular signals regulating liver induction. He pushed the frontiers of in vivo microscopy to reveal new insights into cardiac valve formation and cardiac trabeculation, and used cellular approaches to gain a detailed understanding of these processes. Stainier developed and used single-cell analyses to provide the first in vivo demonstration of the hemangioblast, a formerly hypothetical cell that gives rise to both endothelial and blood cells, as well as the discovery of a new mode of blood vessel formation.  His studies on gut looping morphogenesis revealed the importance of tissue-level physical forces in shaping organs, and his studies on gut lumen formation revealed the importance of fluid flow in this process. He developed a number of cell ablation models that allowed him and others to gain new insights into the process of organ regeneration, with potential implications for novel disease therapies. Most recently, he has also made significant contributions to the understanding of genetic compensation.

Selected awards and honors
Wien International Scholar, Brandeis University 1982-1984
Helen Hay Whitney Foundation Postdoctoral Fellow 1991-1994
Packard Foundation Fellow in Science and Engineering 1995-2000
Established Investigator, American Heart Association 2000-2003
Mossman Award in Developmental Biology, American Association of Anatomists 2002
Annual Byers Award in Basic Science, UCSF 2003-2004
Outstanding Faculty Mentorship Award, UCSF 2003
NIH DEV1, study section founding Chair 2003-2006
Elected Fellow of the American Association for the Advancement of Science 2008
Officier dans l'ordre de Léopold de Belgique 2013
European Research Council (ERC) Advanced Grant 2015
Elected Member of European Molecular Biology Organization (EMBO) 2016
Elected Member of Academia Europaea 2016
Christiane Nüsslein-Volhard Award (European Zebrafish Society) 2017
President, International Zebrafish Society (IZFS) 2020
European Research Council (ERC) Advanced Grant 2020

References

Interviews

Videos
iBiology Seminar Part I: Vertebrate Organ Development: The Zebrafish Heart 
iBiology Seminar Part II: Cardiac Trabeculation
iBiology Seminar Part III: Genetic Compensation
Positional cloning of cloche, a gene that drives endothelial and hematopoietic lineage specification.  (Genetics Society of America)
Curing Diabetes One Fish at a Time: The Long Road of Translational Research. (NIH Wednesday Afternoon Lecture Series)

External links

Website Department of Developmental Genetics, Max Planck Institute for Heart and Lung Research
Website of the Max Planck Society

Website of the American Association for the Advancement of Science
Website of the European Research Council (ERC) 
Website of European Molecular Biology Organization (EMBO)
Website of Academia Europaea
eLife website
Website of the European Zebrafish Society
Website of the International Zebrafish Society

1963 births
Belgian geneticists
Brandeis University alumni
Harvard University alumni
Living people
Scientists from Liège
People educated at Atlantic College
People educated at a United World College
Max Planck Institute directors